Catriona Sturton (born June 8, 1976) is an Ottawa, Ontario–based singer, songwriter and multi-instrumentalist. She has had a prolific career, performing in bands such as Plumtree and collaborating with artists like Joel Plaskett, Al Tuck, the late Dutchy Mason, the Mighty Popo and members of Sloan and Blue Rodeo.

History
Sturton got her start at an early age when her parents put her into classical violin lessons for eight years. In her teens, while shopping for some fiddle music, she saw a harmonica and bought it. This led to a passion for the Blues, and she quickly acquired proficiency with the instrument. Her adolescence was spent under the tutelage of local Ottawa harp legend Larry "The Bird" Mootham and performing in and around Ottawa at various blues bars such as The Whipping Post, The Rainbow and Tucson's.

As a young adult Sturton left Ottawa to study History at Dalhousie University, in Halifax, Nova Scotia. While there she learned to play the bass guitar and joined the indie all-female band Plumtree. With the band she released and recorded two albums, won a YTV Yaa! Achievement Award and toured extensively around Canada with others, like Thrush Hermit and the Weakerthans. Plumtree also inspired the comic series entitled "Scott Pilgrim," named after their hit song. She claims that she used the experience to cut her teeth on the rigours of songwriting, traveling, marketing and other aspects of being a touring musician.

In 2000 Sturton moved to Japan to teach English. While there she met Sonnet Bingham from Arizona. Together with two locals they started The Secret, a bilingual J-Pop influenced Garage band, and toured Japan and Canada. The experience gave Sturton the confidence to write and sing her own songs. During her time in Japan she was greatly influenced by the shamisen.

Current musical projects 
The first instrument Sturton studied seriously was the harmonica. During her teen years, she wanted to be a professional blues harp player and since then, has studied with Larry "The Bird" Mootham and Cuban-Canadian harmonica virtuoso Carlos del Junco. In 2013 Sturton quit her job with a non-profit literary foundation that required her to travel across Canada to focus on her solo music career and follow her passion for playing harmonica. To date she has performed on stage with Neko Case, Dutch Mason and Paul Oscher, and performs regularly with Ottawa blues singer and guitarist John Carroll. In addition to performing, Sturton frequently gives harmonica workshops and has also created instructional videos aimed at audiences curious about playing harmonica.

Selected discography 
2006:  Catriona Sturton and The Screaming Elks – Catriona Sturton and The Screaming Elks Demo (vocals, guitar, harmonica, songwriting) – Modern Soul Records
2006: Digger – (vocals, guitar, harmonica) Ladyfest Ottawa 2006 Compilation
2003: The Secret – Himitsu EP – (vocals, guitar) Himitsu records 002 – Japan
2001:  Chikusen and Soken Danjo – Nembutsu – (chorus vocals on CD of healing music for hospice patients) Aikoto 05 Japan
2001:  Al Tuck – (bass, harmonica) The New High Road of Song – Brobdingnagian Records
2000:  Plumtree – (bass, harmonica, backup vocals, songwriting) This Day Won't Last at All – Endearing Records
1999:  I Love You When You're Walking Away (with Plumtree) – Moshi Moshi: Pop International Style (Compilation) – March Records
1998:  Plumtree – Predicts the Future (bass, backup vocals) – Cinnamon Toast Records
1996: Scott Pilgrim (with Plumtree/The Inbreds) – North Window Split 7" – PF Records

See also
Plumtree (band)
Scott Pilgrim

References

External links
[ Plumtree] on Allmusic

1976 births
Living people
Place of birth missing (living people)
Canadian women singer-songwriters
Canadian rock singers
Canadian pop singers
Canadian blues singers
20th-century Canadian multi-instrumentalists
Musicians from Ottawa
Canadian harmonica players
21st-century Canadian multi-instrumentalists
Canadian accordionists
Women accordionists
20th-century Canadian guitarists
21st-century Canadian guitarists
Canadian women guitarists
Canadian folk singer-songwriters
Canadian indie rock musicians
Canadian blues guitarists
20th-century Canadian women singers
21st-century accordionists
21st-century Canadian women singers
20th-century women guitarists
21st-century women guitarists